Geoffrey Parnell Storey (8 August 1904 – c. 1975) was a rugby union player who represented Australia.

Storey, a lock, was born in Strathfield, New South Wales and claimed a total of 8 international rugby caps for Australia.

References

Australian rugby union players
Australia international rugby union players
People educated at Sydney Grammar School
1904 births
1975 deaths
Rugby union players from Sydney
Rugby union locks